Marguerite de la nuit (US title: Marguerite of the Night) is a 1955 French language motion picture fantasy drama directed by Claude Autant-Lara, and written by Ghislaine Autant-Lara (screenplay & dialogue) and Gabriel Arout (adaptation), based on novel by Pierre Dumarchais. The film stars Michèle Morgan and Yves Montand.

It tells the story of an older pedant who buys adolescence from Satan.

Cast
Michèle Morgan as Marguerite
Yves Montand as M. Léon
Jean Debucourt as L'homme austère
Jacques Clancy as Angelo
Paul Demange as Ua client du 'Pigall's'
Jacques Erwin as the ténor
Camille Guérini
Suzet Maïs as  a client at the 'Pigall's'
Max Mégy
Geneviève Morel as  La concierge
Fernand Sardou as Le patron du café
Hélène Tossy as La patronne du café
Massimo Girotti as  Valentin
Louis Seigner as L'homme de l'hôtel
Jean-François Calvé as  Georges Faust
Palau as  Dr. Faust

External links

Marguerite de la nuit at Alice Cinema

1955 films
1950s fantasy films
French fantasy films
1950s French-language films
Films directed by Claude Autant-Lara
Films based on Goethe's Faust
1950s French films